Matteo Camillo Paul de Brienne (born May 22, 2002) is a Canadian professional soccer player who plays for Valour FC in the Canadian Premier League.

Early life
De Brienne began playing youth soccer at age three with Ottawa South United. In 2013, he was invited by the Dallas Texans SC (an affiliate club of Ottawa South United) to attend trials with the Real Madrid Academy in Spain. He played with the Ontario provincial team at the U14 level. In March 2016, he had a week-long trial with English club Crewe Alexandra. In August 2016, he joined the Vancouver Whitecaps Academy.

University career
In September 2021, he began attending Carleton University, where he played for the men's soccer team. He scored six goals in ten appearances, helping the Ravens capture the silver medal at the national tournament. He was named the OUA West Rookie of the Year. De Brienne was also named to the 2021 U Sports All-Rookie Team, as well to the national tournament all-star team. He was also a nominee for the U Sports Lou Bilek Award (Rookie of the Year).

Club career
On July 31, 2020, de Brienne signed his first professional contract with Canadian Premier League side Atlético Ottawa. However, he did not make any appearances for the club that season.

He began the 2021 season with his former youth club Ottawa South United in the third tier Première ligue de soccer du Québec in July. However, a couple of weeks later he signed with FC Manitoba, who participated in the 2021 Summer Series, after withdrawing from the USL League Two season due to the COVID-19  pandemic. While with FC Manitoba, he was invited to train with CPL club Valour FC.

In January 2022, he initially registered for the 2022 CPL-U Sports Draft, before withdrawing soonafter on January 13. Instead, on January 18, 2022, he signed a contract with CPL club Valour FC. He scored his first professional goal on June 15 against Cavalry FC.

International career
In 2016 and 2017, he attended camps with the Canada U14 and U15 teams respectively.

Personal life
De Brienne is the cousin of current NHL player Matthew Peca.

References

External links

2002 births
Living people
Association football defenders
Canadian soccer players
Soccer people from Ontario
Soccer players from Ottawa
Première ligue de soccer du Québec players
Canadian Premier League players
Carleton Ravens men's soccer players
Ottawa South United players
Vancouver Whitecaps FC players
Atlético Ottawa players
FC Manitoba players
Valour FC players